Izolator Boguchwała is a Polish football club based in the city of Boguchwała in the Rzeszów County.

History
The club was founded in 1944. Affiliated with the local porcelain factory, it was officially registered on 1 November 1947.

In the 1980s and mid 1990s, they played regularly in the third league, in which their finished third in the 1986/87 season.

Stadium
Their stadium is Izo Arena. It was opened in 1947 as the first stadium in the Rzeszów County and built by the porcelain factory workers.

Players

Current squad

Out on loan

See also 
 Boguchwała
 Football in Poland
 List of football clubs in Poland

References

External links
  
 Izolator at 90minut.pl 
 Instagram

Rzeszów County
Football clubs in Poland
Association football clubs established in 1944
1944 establishments in Poland
Football clubs in Podkarpackie Voivodeship